Seth Hartman Yocum (August 2, 1834 – April 19, 1895) was a Greenback member of the U.S. House of Representatives from Pennsylvania.

Seth H. Yocum was born in Catawissa, Pennsylvania.  After attending rural schools, he went to Philadelphia in 1850 and learned the printer's trade.  Yocum also taught school for several years, and graduated from Dickinson College in 1860, where he was a member of Phi Kappa Psi.  During the American Civil War, Yocum entered the Union Army as a private and was promoted to the first lieutenant of the Fifth Pennsylvania Cavalry.  He studied law, was admitted to the Schuylkill County, Pennsylvania bar in 1865 and commenced practice in Ashland, Pennsylvania.  He moved to Bellefonte, Pennsylvania in 1873 and continued the practice of law, serving as district attorney of Centre County, Pennsylvania from 1875 to 1879.

Yocum was elected as a Greenbacker to the Forty-sixth Congress in the 1878 election, but was not a candidate for renomination in 1880.  He moved to Johnson City, Tennessee, and engaged in the tanning business.  He was elected mayor of Johnson City in 1885. After this, Yocum moved to Pasadena, California, and began growing oranges commercially. He died in Santa Monica, California in 1895 and was interred in Mountain View Cemetery in Pasadena.

See also

References
 Retrieved on 2008-2-15
The Political Graveyard

1834 births
1895 deaths
People from Columbia County, Pennsylvania
Greenback Party members of the United States House of Representatives from Pennsylvania
Union Army officers
People from Bellefonte, Pennsylvania
People from Pasadena, California
People from Johnson City, Tennessee
19th-century American politicians
Military personnel from California
Military personnel from Pennsylvania
Members of the United States House of Representatives from Pennsylvania